Frank Anthony Brogan (3 August 1942 – 29 April 2021) was a Scottish professional footballer who played as a winger. During his career he made over 200 appearances for Ipswich Town.

Brogan joined Celtic from St Roch's in 1960, and scored the club's 5000th league goal during the 1962–63 season. His younger brother Jim had a longer association with the Glasgow club. The siblings played in two matches alongside one another for Celtic.

Brogan died in Falkirk on 29 April 2021, aged 78.

References

External links
Frank Brogan at Pride of Anglia

1942 births
2021 deaths
Scottish footballers
Association football wingers
Celtic F.C. players
Ipswich Town F.C. players
Halifax Town A.F.C. players
Footballers from Glasgow
People educated at St Joseph's College, Dumfries
People educated at St Mungo's Academy
Scottish Football League players
English Football League players
St Roch's F.C. players